Roland Van Campenhout or in short Roland (born 1944 in Boom, Belgium) is a Flemish blues musician.

Roland grew up in the Rupel area. His father, a jazzmusician, drowned when he was 5. Roland left home at the age of 14. He did not get involved with music until the age of 20. He played in the skifflegroup, the William & Roland Skiffle Group, and the folk duo Miek en Roel.

In 1969, he changed to another genre: blues, while also still experimenting with other styles during his career such as country, worldmusic, folk and rock. Roland discovered this genre when he saw John Lee Hooker perform in café De Muze in Antwerp. He broke through during Jazz Bilzen, where he established his reputation as a live artist.

1970s and 1980s
During the 1970s he joined Rory Gallagher's band and toured around the world, including to Singapore. He performed with Tim Hardin, Leo Kottke and Ian Anderson. Roland built a reputation as a roaming musician traveling from café to café.  This became less after the birth of his daughter.

In 1985, he achieved commercial success with the record 76cm Per Second, including hits such as "Fish On The Hook" and "Cruising Down On Main Street".

1990s
He was successful in working together with Arno Hintjens and with the "Charles et les Lulus" project (1990–1991).

In 1998, Roland got to interview his idol John Lee Hooker. A year later he was awarded the Lifetime achievement-award by the Zamu Music Awards.

Jaren 2000 
Roland was very active in both blues and country fields during the 2000s. On 5 February 2015, he was inducted into the Radio 2 Hall of Fame.

Discography

Albums 
 A tune for You (1971)
 One step at a time (1972)
 Rock Live (1974)
 Movin' on (1975)
 Snowblind (1981)
 76 Centimeters per second (1985)
 Good as bad can be (1989)
 The last tribe (1990)
 Hole in your soul (1990)
 Roland & friends – live (1990)
 Last letter home (1992)
 Mannen maken plannen – soundtrack (1993)
 Little sweet taste (1994)
 50 (1994)
 Waltz... (1999)
 Nomaden van de Muziek (with Wannes Van de Velde, 2000)
 Waterbottle (with El Fish, 2001)
 Lime & Coconut (2003)
 The great atomic power (2005)
 Never Enough (2008)
 Parcours (2009)
 Dah Blues Iz-A Coming (22 January 2013)
 New found sacred ground (2013)
 Folksongs from a non-existing land (2018)

Singles 
 Your trip is not like mine (1968)
 Buddy is holly (1971)
 Le Brabant sonne (1980)
 Chain gang (1983)
 Cruising down on mainstreet (1985)
 Fish on the hook (1985)
 C'est si bon (1988)
 I'll give all I've got (1989)
 Last letter home (1992)
 A man needs a plan (1992)
 Don't this road look rough and rocky (1992)
 Little sweet taste (1994)
 Down along the cove (1998)
 Hash Bamboo Shuffle (1998)
 Plastic Jezus (1999)
 Lime in the coconut (2003)
 Bird in my pyjamas (2004)
 The Truth (2005)

Best of compilation album
 Day by day – Blow by blow (1994)

References

External links
 Official website
 Discografie on Muziekarchief.be
 Roland op Houbi.com

20th-century Belgian male singers
20th-century Belgian singers
Belgian folk singers
Belgian male guitarists
Blues singers
Blues guitarists
1945 births
Living people
English-language singers from Belgium
21st-century Belgian male singers
21st-century Belgian singers